The Healthcare Convention and Exhibitors Association (HCEA) is a professional association founded in 1930 dedicated to improving the industry of healthcare conventions, medical meetings and healthcare exhibit marketing.

History of HCEA 

Industry advocacy, quality educational programs, informational resources and valuable networking are all hallmarks of the Healthcare Convention & Exhibitors Association (HCEA), which will celebrate its 80th anniversary in 2010.  During its long history, HCEA has developed into a dynamic organization that remains the only association solely dedicated to improving the effectiveness of all conventions, meetings and exhibitions for the healthcare industry.  HCEA brings together industry stakeholders, including healthcare exhibitors, healthcare exhibition and meeting organizers and industry suppliers, who are instrumental in promoting healthcare convention marketing and exhibitions as vital components of the healthcare marketing mix.

The early years 

HCEA began as the Medical Exhibitors Association (MEA) in 1930, launched during the Michigan State Medical Convention in Detroit, Michigan.  According to historical archives, 12 charter members established a treasury with personal donations of $100 each to fund the new organization.  During the first year, MEA membership rose to 22.

In the early 1930s, MEA began compiling information about select medical meetings, and in 1934, MEA published the first Schedule of Conventions (which later evolved to become the Directory of Healthcare Meetings and Conventions).  Later during World War II, MEA supported a wartime convention program with the U. S. Office of Defense and Transportation.

In 1951, MEA joined forces with convention managers to hold the first Joint Conference on Medical Conventions (JCMC).  This group of convention managers would later organize as the Professional Convention Management Association (PCMA).

Becoming HCEA 

In 1973, the organization announced that it had changed its name to the Health Care Exhibitors Association to represent more closely the broad range of business activities of its members.  In the mid-1970s, the association moved its headquarters to Birmingham, Alabama.  By 1978 membership stood at 209 and was open only to companies exhibiting at healthcare meetings, a policy that later changed when membership was opened to healthcare associations and industry suppliers.

The year 1984 marked several significant changes for HCEA.  The headquarters moved again to New Caanan, Connecticut.  Also, the January JCMC meeting proved to be the last that HCEA and PCMA would hold jointly.  Thereafter, HCEA would hold its own Annual Meeting every June.

In January 1986, an association management firm headquartered in Atlanta, Georgia, was chosen to manage HCEA, a change that led to many new important developments for the organization.  From 1986 to 1990, rapid growth and expansion took place.  Membership increased by 43 percent, Annual Meeting attendance increased nearly 100 percent and member services grew dramatically.

On January 1, 1990, at the beginning of its 60th anniversary, HCEA added the word "Convention" to its title, becoming the Healthcare Convention & Exhibitors Association to reflect the wider range of activities of HCEA's members.  Then in 1994, HCEA published a prototype study on the value of healthcare exhibiting.  Also, HCEA held a joint seminar with the International Pharmaceutical Congress Advisory Association (IPCAA) in Vienna.  Additionally, HCEA's Guidelines on International Healthcare Exhibitions & Congresses were first published in 1995.

The latter half of the 1990s saw even more rapid changes.  In 1998 HCEA and IPCAA were instrumental in forming the Healthcare Congress Alliance, an international body dedicated to developing tools and documents to increase efficiency in global healthcare congresses.  Then in 1999, HCEA launched the Healthcare Convention Marketing Summit, a one-day educational meeting held in January that focused on high-level peer-to-peer learning.

The 21st century 

HCEA began the next century with several new programs.  For example, HCEA's Research Grant Program was created to fund academic research on the healthcare exhibiting industry.  The first study from that program, conducted by Dr. Jeff Tanner of Baylor University, was completed and published in 2005.  Also, an e-mail newsletter, now known as HCEA Edge, was launched to bring up-to-date industry information directly to the members.  And in 2004, HCEA launched the Online Directory of Healthcare Meetings & Conventions.

In 2005, HCEA celebrated its 75th anniversary, and a number of new member benefits and services were unveiled to commemorate it.  For instance, a members-only online resource center was introduced, and a staff initiative to conduct exhibitor training for exhibitors at healthcare conventions was launched.

In January 2007 HCEA debuted landmark research on the state of the healthcare exhibitions industry.  The groundbreaking research analyzed over 15,000 healthcare meetings over the previous decade, and included information on professional attendance trend analyses for all reported medical meetings, medical meetings defined by size categories and medical meetings defined by therapeutic specialties.  This research study has become an annual project for HCEA and continues to provide valuable perspective for members planning their marketing strategies.  In addition, HCEA introduced other industry benchmarking resources including the HCEA 100 Index Report, which identifies 100 bellwether medical conventions throughout the United States, and the HCEA top 50 largest medical meetings ranked by total reported attendance.  In 2008 HCEA released research results on the impact of globalization on medical meetings and conventions.

External links
 www.hcea.org

Medical and health organizations based in Virginia
Professional associations based in the United States